Christopher Ronald Nurse (born 7 May 1984) is an English-born Guyanese footballer who plays for Miami United FC in the National Premier Soccer League and the Guyana national team.

Career

Club
Nurse began his professional career in the English non-League system as a dynamic young midfielder who was a part of the youth academy at Kingstonian F.C before featuring for the reserve team & impressive displays during pre-season saw him rewarded with a place in the senior squad.

Nurse has extensive experience at multiple levels. He played for Aldershot & Stevenage Borough in the Conference National and almost won promotion from the Conference North with Hinckley United in 2006–07.

On 6 March 2009, the USL First Division team Rochester Rhinos announced the signing of Nurse to a one-year deal for the 2009 season. reaching the play-offs but were eliminated by the Puerto Rico Islanders.

In March 2010 the Puerto Rico Islanders completed the signing of Nurse to a one-year deal. Nurse played in the proceeding three CFU Club Championship matches and led the Islanders to become the 2010 CFU Club Championship Winners in Trinidad and Tobago. In July 2010 Nurse played for the Puerto Rico Islanders defeating the then MLS league leaders, Los Angeles Galaxy 5–3 on aggregate, which paved the way for their progression to the group stages of the CONCACAF Champions League for the third consecutive year. Nurse continued his strong performances leading Puerto Rico to the USSF Division 2 Pro League championship title defeating the Carolina Railhawks in the Playoff Final.

Nurse signed with Carolina RailHawks of the North American Soccer League on 7 March 2011. Nurse was part of a sensational season for the Railhawks, going on a 10-game win streak in a team that broke almost every existing club record and finishing top of the North American Soccer League winning the regular season title. He re-signed with Carolina for the 2012 season on 1 February 2012.

In January 2013 Nurse was signed by FC Edmonton after his previous club Puerto Rico Islanders folded and no longer continued to operate. In 2013 Nurse was selected 7 times onto North American Soccer League Team of the Week and selected North American Soccer League August Player of the Month. At the end of the season Nurse was Shortlisted for North American Soccer League 2013 Best XI and Voted 2013 FC Edmonton players MVP of the season by his teammates,

In January 2014 Nurse Signed with the Fort Lauderdale Strikers and was part of a talented squad that saw the team finish Runners- Up in the Soccer Bowl 2014. Nurse was nominated 2014 North American Soccer League Humanitarian of the Year Award for his work with the Breast Cancer Associations in South Florida.

Nurse was released by Puerto Rico at the end of their 2016 season.

International
Nurse, who is of Guyanese descent, is a current International player for the Guyana national football team nicknamed the Golden Jaguars, despite having been born in England. In September 2011, Nurse was announced captain of the Guyana national football team for the 2014 FIFA World Cup qualification matches.

International goals
Scores and results list Guyana's goal tally first.

Personal
As a young boy Nurse played Sunday league football for Wallington Wanderers Football Club and Carshalton Athletic alongside footballer Nigel Reo-Coker. From here Nurse progressed onto Kingstonian Football Academy, balancing full-time training with academic studies going onto complete a BTEC National Diploma in Sports Studies and completed a BSc (Hons) degree in applied sports therapy from 2005 to 2008 at University College Birmingham (the degree was awarded by Birmingham University).

Nurse's brother Jon played for English Football League Two side Dagenham & Redbridge and international football for Barbados.

During Nurse's time with the Puerto Rico Islanders he spearheaded a significant fund raiser for Susan G Komen Breast Cancer Foundation in memory of his mother and raised in excess of $6000. The team wore pink jerseys which were raffled after a home fixture.

Honors

Kingstonian Football Club
Surrey Senior Cup Runners Up: 2003

Sutton United Football Club
Isthmian League Runners Up: 2003/04

Hinckley United
Conference North Playoff Runners Up: 2006/07

Puerto Rico Islanders
USSF Division 2 Pro League Champions: 2010
CFU Club Championship Winner: 2010

Carolina Railhawks
NASL Regular Season Champions: 2011

Fort Lauderdale Strikers
North American Soccer League Soccer Bowl 2014 Runners-Up: 
North American Soccer League Humanitarian of the Year: 2014

References

External links
Rochester Rhinos bio 

Halesowen Town bio
Hinckley United stats archive
International Statistics  at CaribbeanFootballDatabase

1984 births
Living people
Guyanese footballers
English footballers
English people of Guyanese descent
Guyana international footballers
Association football midfielders
Kingstonian F.C. players
Sutton United F.C. players
Aldershot Town F.C. players
Moor Green F.C. players
Hinckley United F.C. players
Tamworth F.C. players
Stevenage F.C. players
Halesowen Town F.C. players
Rochester New York FC players
AFC Telford United players
Puerto Rico Islanders players
North Carolina FC players
FC Edmonton players
Fort Lauderdale Strikers players
Puerto Rico FC players
National League (English football) players
USL First Division players
Expatriate footballers in Puerto Rico
Expatriate soccer players in the United States
Expatriate soccer players in Canada
British expatriates in Puerto Rico
USSF Division 2 Professional League players
North American Soccer League players
Footballers from Hammersmith
Alumni of the University of Birmingham
University College Birmingham